The rivière Noire (English: Black River) is a tributary of the rivière des Hurons, flowing in the heart of the municipality of the townships of Stoneham-et-Tewkesbury, located north of the city of Quebec, in the La Jacques-Cartier Regional County Municipality, in the administrative region of the Capitale-Nationale, in the province of Quebec, in Canada.

The Black River valley is mainly served by route 175 and boulevard Talbot.

The surface of the Black River (except the rapids areas) is generally frozen from the beginning of December to the end of March; however, safe circulation on the ice is generally done from the end of December to the beginning of March. The water level of the river varies with the seasons and the precipitation; the spring flood occurs in March or April.

Geography 

Its course flows south generally between route 175 (route Antonio-Talbot) and boulevard Talbot, except two excursions to the west by cutting boulevard Talbot, to its confluence with the rivière des Hurons (coming from the northeast).

Toponymy 
This toponymic designation appears on a 1931 map. This name derives from the fact that, during heavy rains, the river water from the high mountains bordering it turns black.

The toponym "Rivière Noire" was formalized on September 28, 2004, at the Commission de toponymie du Québec.

See also 
 St. Lawrence River
 List of rivers of Quebec

References 

 Brodeur, C., F. Lewis, E. Huet-Alegre, Y. Ksouri, M.-C. Leclerc and D. Viens. 2007. Portrait of the Saint-Charles river basin. Saint-Charles river basin council. 216 p + 9 annexes 217-340 pp.

Rivers of Capitale-Nationale
La Jacques-Cartier Regional County Municipality